Live is a DVD and 2-CD set released by American progressive rock band Spock's Beard. The two versions are only available separately.

It is a live album that features the entire concert played by the band at Zoetermeer, Netherlands, on May 25, 2007. It is also the second live album released by the band after the departure of Neal Morse, and is the first one recorded for DVD without the presence of the band's former frontman. Morse recorded his own live album Sola Scriptura and Beyond at the same venue the following night Spock's Beard recorded this album.

Release dates were varied: June 13, 2008 for Austria, Germany, Switzerland, June 16, 2008 for the rest of Europe and June 24, 2008 for North America.

Track listing

CD Version

Disc One
 "Intro" – 1:32
 "On a Perfect Day" – 8:00
 "In the Mouth of Madness" – 4:58
 "Crack the Big Sky" – 10:35
 "The Slow Crash Landing Man" – 7:05
 "Return to Whatever" – 6:37
 "Surfing Down the Avalanche" – 4:26
 "Thoughts (Part II)" – 4:58
 "Drum Duel" – 4:48
 "Skeletons at the Feast" – 7:14

Disc Two
 "Walking on the Wind" – 10:04
 "Hereafter" (Ryo solo) – 3:36As Far as the Mind Can See
 "Part 1 - Dreaming in the Age of Answers" – 5:06
 "Part 2 - Here's a Man" – 3:35
 "Part 3 - They Know We Know" – 3:15
 "Part 4 - Stream of Unconsciousness" – 5:49
 "Rearranged" – 6:56Medley
 "The Water" – 6:12
 "Go the Way You Go" – 7:49

DVD Version
 "Intro"
 "On a Perfect Day"
 "In the Mouth of Madness"
 "Crack the Big Sky"
 "The Slow Crash Landing Man"
 "Return to Whatever"
 "Surfing Down the Avalanche"
 "Thoughts (Part II)"
 "Drum Duel"
 "Skeletons at the Feast"
 "Walking on the Wind"
 "Hereafter" (Ryo solo)As Far as the Mind Can See
 "Part 1 - Dreaming in the Age of Answers"
 "Part 2 - Here's a Man"
 "Part 3 - They Know We Know"
 "Part 4 - Stream of Unconsciousness"
 "Rearranged"Medley
 "The Water"
 "Go the Way You Go"

Personnel
Nick D'Virgilio – lead and backing vocals, drums, guitar and keyboards
Dave Meros – bass guitar, bass synth and backing vocals
Alan Morse – guitars and backing vocals
Ryo Okumoto – keyboards and backing vocals

Additional personnel
Jimmy Keegan - drums and backing vocals

Notes and references

Spock's Beard albums
Spock's Beard video albums
Live video albums
2008 live albums
2008 video albums
Inside Out Music live albums
Inside Out Music video albums